The Men's marathon 2 was a wheelchair marathon event in athletics at the 1984 Summer Paralympics. The race was won by Heinz Frei.

Results

See also
 Marathon at the Paralympics

References 

Men's marathon 2
1984 marathons
Marathons at the Paralympics
Men's marathons